Granada is a town and municipality in the Meta Department, Colombia.

Symbols

Shield 
The shield is made up of two axes, a symbol of colonization. The first appears in the year 1939, when the population of what is now Granada began. In the second the date 1956, when it was erected as a municipality. A ribbon with the inscription "Land of work for men of peace" connects the two axes. The shield, in the upper part, is divided into three parts, each one with the different colors of the flag. First we see the white dove symbolizing peace, in the center the open pomegranate that symbolizes the agricultural variety and finally in the third there are two hands intertwined as a welcome to the visitors. At the bottom is the Guillermo León Valencia bridge.

Flag 
The pavilion has three equal stripes of green, white and red. The green represents agriculture as the main economic line of the region, the white represents the peaceful vocation of its people, and the red represents the blood of the patriots from the plains who gave us freedom.

History

Foundation: June 23, 1953 
In the municipality of Granada, there were three indigenous cultures: the Guayupe (the largest group), the Sae and the Operigua, who did not have their territory well defined; They only presented language and cultural differences, which were not studied, as they yielded to the pressure of the first European colonizations, promoted by the companies that exploited rubber, cinchona, balata and wood.

Granada, previously called Boquemonte, as it is the entrance to a royal road through the forests of the plain of the Ariari river; lived the same population dynamics as the Orinoquía, a natural region known as the Eastern Plains, made up of the political-administrative divisions corresponding to the departments of Meta, Arauca, Casanare and Vichada.

The Ariari region, whose most important municipality is Granada, began with the population displacement from the Cundiboyacense highlands and Sumapaz in the middle of the last century, and was accentuated between 1950 and 1970 with migrations towards the upper Ariari, made up of the municipalities from Cubarral, Granada, El Castillo, Medellín del Ariari, Fuente de Oro and Lejanías.

On June 23, 1956, Boquemonte changed its name to Nueva Granada; Likewise, on November 19 of the same year, by decree 299, he was elected to the category of municipality.

Tourism

Places

Bridge El Alcaraván 
The El Alcaraván bridge connects Granada with the municipalities of San Juan de Arama, Vista Hermosa, Mesetas and Uribe.

Parties and celebrations

Summer Festival 
The summer festival is one of the best known and most important in the region, this is due to the different cultural and sporting events. Every year this festival is celebrated in the month of January, enjoying the shores of the beautiful beaches of the Ariari River, activities are known such as: campercross, extreme sports, motocross, aerobics, soccer, beach volleyball, reign, mountain bike etc. Also what makes this festival unforgettable are the different artists who attend this event to make everyone happy, finally the traditional event, the regatta through the Ariari river, where hundreds of people gather to embark on their journey in the waters of the river.

Economy 

The economic activities of the municipality are:

- Agricultural production, with crops of irrigated and rainfed rice, corn, banana, African palm, cocoa, cassava, sugar cane, papaya, citrus and passion fruit.

Secondly, the traditional extensive and semi-extensive grazing livestock.

Now tourism, fish farming for consumption and ornamental fish and, last but not least, open-air exploitation.So it is a town known for its livestock, and has one of the best fairs and festivals, where you can see exhibitions from fine paso horses to coleus.

References

Municipalities of Meta Department